Cyclone (Spanish: El Ciclón; also known as Terror Storm) is a 1978 Mexican survival horror film directed by René Cardona Jr. and starring Arthur Kennedy, Carroll Baker, and Lionel Stander. The plot follows a group of passengers from a crashed airplane who find refuge on a small tour boat in the ocean, and who eventually resort to cannibalism for survival. The film is purportedly based in part on Alfred Hitchcock's Lifeboat (1944).

Plot
The Caribbean Sea, somewhere on the coast of Mexico. The local authorities receive reports about an approaching cyclone and issue a general alert, but a small passenger plane, a tour boat and a fishing trawler fail to receive - or heed - the warning and are caught in the storm. The fishing vessel springs a leak and sinks, forcing the fishermen to abandon it; the airplane crashes into the sea, killing most of the passengers and forcing the rest to evacuate; the tour boat's motor is damaged, and one of the tourists is swept overboard and drowns. After the storm has abated, sharks are lured to the area by the dead inside the plane wreck, and subsequently kill one of the drifting survivors.

Once the cyclone is gone, the Mexican coast guard starts a fruitless search for the missing, and after three days they abandon hope of finding any survivors. The plane passengers are picked up by the fishermen, and later they are taken in by the drifting tour boat, for a total of twenty-seven people trying to survive. As food and water run out, the fishermen kill a dog belonging to one of the tourists for them to eat. When one of the fishermen dies, he is used to bait a shark, but the shark manages to snatch the corpse away. When one of the tourists perishes, his body is cut up and his flesh cured and salted for food. In addition, one of the female tourists gives birth to a baby. As the days wear on and the situation becomes more and more desperate, it is decided that several of the passengers and Pitorro, the trawler's captain, use the lifeboat to go for help. The drifters are eventually picked up by a passing American yacht, and rescue efforts are initiated.

As the night passes, a female passenger dies and is cast overboard by her grieving husband. The next day, when Taylor, a selfish passenger from the plane, tries to appropriate some of the sparse water supply for himself, a fight breaks out, in which course the glass bottom of the boat is shattered. The boat sinks, forcing the occupants into the water. As they float in the sea, sharks are attracted to the scene and devour almost half of the shipwrecked, including Taylor, before two seaplanes arrive and rescue the remaining survivors.

Cast
Arthur Kennedy as The Priest
Carroll Baker as Sheila
Lionel Stander as Taylor 
Andrés García as Andrés
Hugo Stiglitz as Pilot
Mario Almada as Pitorro
Olga Karlatos as Monica
Stefania D'Amario as Linda, the Stewardess
Edith González as Tiersa

Release
The film was released in 1978, though the German and Italian releases were severely censored, toning down the cannibalism subplot. The original cut of the film, released internationally, runs at 114 minutes, while the cut German and Italian releases ran 97 minutes.

References

External links
 

1978 films
1978 horror films
English-language Mexican films
Mexican disaster films
Films shot in Mexico
Films about cannibalism
Films about survivors of seafaring accidents or incidents
Films about shark attacks
Films scored by Riz Ortolani
Films about sharks
Films set in Mexico
Films set in the Caribbean
1970s English-language films
1970s Mexican films